In the mathematical field of order theory, an ultrafilter on a given partially ordered set (or "poset")  is a certain subset of  namely a maximal filter on  that is, a proper filter on  that cannot be enlarged to a bigger proper filter on 

Ultrafilters have many applications in set theory, model theory, topology and combinatorics.

Ultrafilters on partial orders

In order theory, an ultrafilter is a subset of a partially ordered set that is maximal among all proper filters.  This implies that any filter that properly contains an ultrafilter has to be equal to the whole poset.

Formally, if  is a set, partially ordered by  then 
 a subset  is called a filter on  if
  is nonempty,
 for every  and   implies that  is in  too;
 there is no proper filter  on  that properly extends  (that is, such that  is a proper subset of ).

Every ultrafilter falls into exactly one of two categories: principal or free. A principal (or fixed, or trivial) ultrafilter is a filter containing a least element. Consequently, principal ultrafilters are of the form  for some (but not all) elements  of the given poset. Any ultrafilter that is not principal is called a free (or non-principal) ultrafilter.

For ultrafilters on a powerset  a principal ultrafilter consists of all subsets of  that contain a given element  Each ultrafilter on  that is also a principal filter is of this form.
If  is infinite then the Fréchet filter is not an ultrafilter on the power set of  but it is an ultrafilter on the finite–cofinite algebra of  

Every filter on a Boolean algebra (or more generally, any subset with the finite intersection property) is contained in an ultrafilter (see ultrafilter lemma) and that free ultrafilters therefore exist, but the proofs involve the axiom of choice (AC) in the form of Zorn's lemma. On the other hand, the statement that every filter is contained in an ultrafilter does not imply AC. Indeed, it is equivalent to the Boolean prime ideal theorem (BPIT), a well-known intermediate point between the axioms of Zermelo–Fraenkel set theory (ZF) and the ZF theory augmented by the axiom of choice (ZFC). In general, proofs involving the axiom of choice do not produce explicit examples of free ultrafilters, though it is possible to find explicit examples in some models of ZFC;  for example, Gödel showed that this can be done in the constructible universe where one can write down an explicit global choice function.   In ZF without the axiom of choice, it is possible that every ultrafilter is principal.

Ultrafilter on a Boolean algebra

An important special case of the concept occurs if the considered poset is a Boolean algebra.

  is an ultrafilter on 
  is a prime filter on 
 for each  either  or  
A proof that 1. and 2. are equivalent is also given in (Burris, Sankappanavar, 2012, Corollary 3.13, p.133).

Moreover, ultrafilters on a Boolean algebra can be related to maximal ideals and homomorphisms to the 2-element Boolean algebra {true, false} (also known as 2-valued morphisms) as follows:
 Given a homomorphism of a Boolean algebra onto {true, false}, the inverse image of "true" is an ultrafilter, and the inverse image of "false" is a maximal ideal.
 Given a maximal ideal of a Boolean algebra, its complement is an ultrafilter, and there is a unique homomorphism onto {true, false} taking the maximal ideal to "false".
 Given an ultrafilter on a Boolean algebra, its complement is a maximal ideal, and there is a unique homomorphism onto {true, false} taking the ultrafilter to "true".

Ultrafilter on the power set of a set

Given an arbitrary set  its power set  ordered by set inclusion, is always a Boolean algebra; hence the results of the above section  apply. The above formal definitions can be particularized to the powerset case as follows:

The empty set is not an element of 
If  is a subset of  then either  or its relative complement  is an element of 

Such a function is called a 2-valued morphism. However,  is usually not , and hence does not define a measure in the usual sense.

For a filter  that is not an ultrafilter, one would say  if  and  if  leaving  undefined elsewhere.

Applications

Ultrafilters on power sets are useful in topology, especially in relation to compact Hausdorff spaces, and in model theory in the construction of ultraproducts and ultrapowers. Every ultrafilter on a compact Hausdorff space converges to exactly one point. Likewise, ultrafilters on Boolean algebras play a central role in Stone's representation theorem. In set theory ultrafilters are used to show that the axiom of constructibility is incompatible with the existence of a measurable cardinal . This is proved by taking the ultrapower of the set theoretical universe modulo a -complete, non-principal ultrafilter.

The set  of all ultrafilters of a poset  can be topologized in a natural way, that is in fact closely related to the above-mentioned representation theorem. Especially, when considering the ultrafilters on a powerset  the resulting topological space is the Stone–Čech compactification of a discrete space of cardinality 

The ultraproduct construction in model theory uses ultrafilters to produce a new model starting from a sequence of -indexed models; for example, the compactness theorem can be proved this way.
In the special case of ultrapowers, one gets elementary extensions of structures. For example, in nonstandard analysis, the hyperreal numbers can be constructed as an ultraproduct of the real numbers, extending the domain of discourse from real numbers to sequences of real numbers. This sequence space is regarded as a superset of the reals by identifying each real with the corresponding constant sequence. To extend the familiar functions and relations (e.g., + and <) from the reals to the hyperreals, the natural idea is to define them pointwise. But this would lose important logical properties of the reals; for example, pointwise < is not a total ordering. So instead the functions and relations are defined "pointwise modulo" , where  is an ultrafilter on the index set of the sequences; by Łoś' theorem, this preserves all properties of the reals that can be stated in first-order logic. If  is nonprincipal, then the extension thereby obtained is nontrivial.

In geometric group theory, non-principal ultrafilters are used to define the asymptotic cone of a group. This construction yields a rigorous way to consider , that is the large scale geometry of the group. Asymptotic cones are particular examples of ultralimits of metric spaces.

Gödel's ontological proof of God's existence uses as an axiom that the set of all "positive properties" is an ultrafilter.

In social choice theory, non-principal ultrafilters are used to define a rule (called a social welfare function) for aggregating the preferences of infinitely many individuals. Contrary to Arrow's impossibility theorem for finitely many individuals, such a rule satisfies the conditions (properties) that Arrow proposes (for example, Kirman and Sondermann, 1972). Mihara (1997, 1999) shows, however, such rules are practically of limited interest to social scientists, since they are non-algorithmic or non-computable.

See also

Notes

References

Bibliography

Further reading 

Order theory
Families of sets
Nonstandard analysis